Scleromystax reisi is a species of catfish of the family Callichthyidae.  Its distribution is in the streams of tributaries of the rio Jacuí and rio Camaquã of the laguna dos Patos drainage, of the Rio Grande do Sul in Brazil.

Etymology
The fish is named in honor of Roberto E. Reis  of the Pontificia Universidade Católica do Rio Grande do Sul, because of his many contributions to neotropical ichthyology, and the studies of callichthyid fishes.

References 

| Introducing a New Catfish, Scleromystax reisi

Callichthyidae
Catfish of South America
Fish of Brazil
Taxa named by Marcelo Ribeiro de Britto
Taxa named by Clayton Kunio Fukakusa
Taxa named by Luiz Roberto Malabarba
Fish described in 2016